The Kumeu River drains the northern Waitākere Ranges near Auckland, New Zealand, running past the town of Kumeū before merging into the Kaipara River.

Description 

The river begins on the northern slopes of Pukematekeo, the northernmost peak in the Waitākere Ranges Regional Park. It flows north to the townships of Waitākere and Taupaki. When the river reaches Kumeū and Huapai, it flows due west, meeting the Kaipara River north-east of Waimauku. The Waikoukou Stream and Ahukuramu Stream also meet the Kaipara River in the same location.

The river has a number of tributaries, including the McEntee Stream, Mangatoetoe Stream and Pakinui Stream.

History 

The stream is in the traditional rohe of Te Kawerau ā Maki. Historically the upper river catchment was dominated by a kahikatea forest, and was used for a number of purposes: to hunt kūkupa (kererū, or New Zealand wood pigeon) and harvest harakeke (New Zealand flax) and toetoe (Austroderia) for weaving.

The river formed a section of Te Tōangaroa, the portage between the Kaipara and the Waitematā Harbours. Ngongetepara (Brigham Creek) is less than two kilometres away from the Kumeū River at its closest point.

The traditional taniwha kaitiaki (guardian) of the Kaipara and Kumeū Rivers was called Tangihua.

References

External links
Photograph of Kumeu River held in Auckland Libraries' heritage collections.

Rivers of the Auckland Region
Kaipara Harbour catchment